Chen Shih-meng (born 4 August 1948) is a Taiwanese economics scholar and politician. Chen supported the independence of Taiwan.

Biography
His grandfather, was an official in the Nationalist government. In 1970 he graduated from National Taiwan University, majoring in economics. He earned his Doctor of Economics from Ohio State University in 1978.

Chen joined the Kuomintang in 1966 and quit the party in 1991, to join the Democratic Progressive Party. In 1992, Chen joined the Goa-Seng-Lang Association For Taiwan Independence. He was Secretary General of the Democratic Progressive Party in February 1992, and held that office until September 1992.

Chen once served as Vice-Mayor of Taipei, while Chen Shui-bian was its Mayor. He became the Vice-President of the Central Bank of the Republic of China in 2000. In 2002 he became Secretary General of the Office of the President of the Republic of China, a position he held until 2003. From 2003 to 2004, he was President of Ketagalan Institute. He then taught at National Taiwan University. In March 2017, Chen was nominated to the Control Yuan. He was confirmed in 2018, and took office on 29 January 2018. Chen resigned from the Control Yuan on 16 January 2020, stating that he was unable to advocate for reform of the body during his tenure. His resignation took effect on 31 January 2020.

References

1948 births
Living people
National Taiwan University alumni
Academic staff of the National Taiwan University
Ohio State University Graduate School alumni
20th-century Taiwanese economists
Taiwanese Members of the Control Yuan
Deputy mayors of Taipei
21st-century Taiwanese economists